Edvaldo Oliveira (born 18 November 1963) is a Brazilian former professional tennis player.

Biography
A right-handed player from São Paulo, Oliveira represented Brazil in a 1982 Davis Cup tie against Ecuador in Fortaleza. He played the opening singles rubber and was beaten by Ricardo Ycaza.

Oliveira reached a best singles ranking of 208 in the world during his career. He featured in the qualifying draw for the 1983 Wimbledon Championships.

Together with former player Thiago Alves he now runs a tennis training centre.

Challenger titles

Doubles: (1)

See also
List of Brazil Davis Cup team representatives

References

External links
 
 
 

1963 births
Living people
Brazilian male tennis players
Sportspeople from São Paulo (state)
21st-century Brazilian people
20th-century Brazilian people